Olek may refer to:  
Olek, Nakło County, a village in Poland
Olek (artist), Polish-born artist

People with the name
Alfred Olek, Polish footballer
Olek Czyż, Polish basketball player
Olek Krupa or Aleksander Krupa, Polish actor often credited as Olek Krupa